Passport is a Nigerian Nollywood Comedy movie that was storied and Written by Abosi Ogba, directed by Vincent Okonkwo. The movie featured nollywood stars like Mercy Johnson Okojie, Jide Kosoko, Jim Iyke, Zubby Michael, Lateef Adedimeji. The movie was released on 2nd September 2022 by VSL Media.    

The movie is Centred on two major characters Oscar(Jim Iyke) who lost his travelling passport and kopiko(Mercy Johnson Okojie) who wants to be chairperson of the community but needed to defeat terminator(Zubby Michael) in the community elections.

Synopsis 
The movie is about the story of Oscar and kopiko, two people who are both in search of excitement in their life but are at opposite ends of the loneliness life. Oscar on his way to the Airport planing on returning back to the UK to meet his sick mother, in the car with his uncle, Oscar lost his bag containing his travelling passport to some street guys(mighty and Tobee) , and needs the assistance of a tomboy (kopiko) who lives in the ghetto to get his passport back. He had to cooperate with her if he doesn't want to miss a flight to a crucial job interview in United Kingdom. 

On the other hand kopiko a Tomboy who grew up in the ghetto,with his sister and sick mother, seeing the lack of development in the community, which prompted her desire to become chairperson in the community, but has terminator to contend with for the post.

Movie premiere 
The movie was produced by the VSL Media and was premiered in cinemas nationwide on the 2nd of September 2022. The movie was opened in 56 cinema locations in Nigeria on it debut day.

Casts and crew

Crew members 
Script write by Abosi Ogba 

Directed by Dimeji Ajibola

Produced by Vincent Okonkwo 

Production company VSL Media

Casts 
Daniel Abua as Ahmed 

Lateef Adedimeji as Abubakar 

Stephen Damian as Tispy

Lina Idoko as Mighty

Caroline Igben as Queen 

Jim Iyke as Oscar

Jide Kosoko as Mr pounds( Oscar's Uncle) 

Zubby Michael as Terminator 

Nasboi as kasper

Emeka Nwagbaraocha as Tobee

Emem Ufot as Professor 

Mercy Johnson Okojie as Kopiko

References